Marachiara Romero Borella (born June 3, 1986) is an Italian professional mixed martial artist who competed in the Women's Flyweight division of the Ultimate Fighting Championship.

Background 
Borella taught Judo and was a personal trainer before a friend introduced her to MMA, which started her MMA career.Her father is Italian, and her mother is Honduran.

Mixed martial arts career

Early career 
Borella started her professional MMA career in 2014 and fought primarily in the European circuit. Borella joined Invicta Fighting Championships (Invicta) prior to signing with the UFC in 2017.

Invicta Fighting Championships
Borella faced Milana Dudieva on July 15, 2017 at FC 24: Dudieva vs. Borella. She won the fight via a split decision with the scoreboard of (30-27, 28-29 29-28).

Ultimate Fighting Championship 
Borella made her UFC debut on October 7, 2017.  Borella faced Kalindra Faria at UFC 216 in Las Vegas, United States, replacing Andrea Lee. She won the fight via a submission.

Borella next faced Katlyn Chookagian on January 27, 2018 at UFC on Fox 27. She lost the fight via a unanimous decision.

Borella faced Taila Santos on February 2, 2019 at UFC Fight Night: Assunção vs. Moraes 2. She won the fight by split decision.

Borella faced Lauren Murphy on August 3, 2019 at UFC on ESPN 5. She lost the fight via TKO in the third round.

Borella faced Montana De La Rosa on February 15, 2020 at UFC Fight Night 167. She lost the fight via unanimous decision.

Borella faced Cortney Casey on  May 16, 2020 at UFC on ESPN: Overeem vs. Harris. She lost the bout in the first round via submission through an armbar.

Borella was expected to face promotional newcomer Miranda Maverick on June 27, 2020 at UFC on ESPN: Poirier vs. Hooker. However, Maverick was forced to pull out due to injury. In turn, Borella was removed from the card and will be rescheduled for a future event.

Borella faced Mayra Bueno Silva on September 5, 2020 at UFC Fight Night 177. She lost the fight via a submission in round one.

On October 2, 2020 it was reported Borella was released by UFC.

Post-UFC career
After the release, Borella again signed with the Invicta FC and was scheduled to face Brogan Walker-Sanchez at Invicta FC 44 on August 27, 2021. However, Borella was forced to withdraw from the bout due to visa issues and was replaced by Emilee King.

Championships and accomplishments

Mixed martial arts 
 Kombat League
 Kombat League Bantamweight Champion (One time)

Controversies

Suspension for 26 years for distributing and selling of cocaine

Borella was arrested by Italian authorities under "Operation Flanker" for distributing and selling cocaine and cannabis at sporting venues, an operation conducted by the Investigative Unit of the Carabinieri of Piacenza in Emilia and Lombardy.  Borella entered into plea deals in 2012 along with 33 defendants where punishments were of up to one and four years in prison. She spent a period in prison and later under house arrest for the incident.

Borella was also suspended by the National Anti Doping Agency of Italy for 15 years for distributing and selling prohibited drugs. The same agency then added an additional 11-year suspension, for a total of 26 years, until 2044, for use of Italian sporting facilities while serving a suspension under the Italian Anti Doping Code article 4.12.3. It was reported on October 19, 2018, that Borella was free to compete in the UFC as the United States Anti-Doping Agency (USADA) UFC anti-doping program does not consider Borella's criminal activity a violation, as it was unrelated to performance enhancement.

Mixed martial arts record

|-
|Loss
|align=center|12–9 (2)
|Mayra Bueno Silva
|Submission (armbar)
|UFC Fight Night: Covington vs. Woodley
|
|align=center|1
|align=center|2:29
|Las Vegas, Nevada, United States
|
|-
|Loss
|align=center|12–8 (2)
|Cortney Casey
|Submission (armbar)
|UFC on ESPN: Overeem vs. Harris
|
|align=center|1
|align=center|3:36
|Jacksonville, Florida, United States
|
|-
|Loss
|align=center|12–7 (2)
|Montana De La Rosa
|Decision (unanimous)
|UFC Fight Night: Anderson vs. Błachowicz 2 
|
|align=center|3
|align=center|5:00
|Rio Rancho, New Mexico, United States
|
|- 
|Loss
|align=center|12–6 (2)
|Lauren Murphy
|TKO (knee and elbows)
|UFC on ESPN: Covington vs. Lawler
|
|align=center|3
|align=center|1:46
|Newark, New Jersey, United States
|
|-
|Win
|align=center|12–5 (2)
|Taila Santos
|Decision (split)
|UFC Fight Night: Assunção vs. Moraes 2
|
|align=center|3
|align=center|5:00
|Fortaleza, Brazil 
|
|-
|Loss
|align=center|11–5 (2)
|Katlyn Chookagian
|Decision (unanimous)
|UFC on Fox: Jacaré vs. Brunson 2
| 
|align=center|3
|align=center|5:00
|Charlotte, North Carolina, United States
|
|-
|Win
|align=center|11–4 (2)
|Kalindra Faria
|Submission (rear-naked choke)
|UFC 216
| 
|align=center|1
|align=center|2:54
|Las Vegas, Nevada, United States
|
|-
|Win
|align=center|10–4 (2)
|Milana Dudieva
|Decision (split) 
|Invicta FC 24: Dudieva vs. Borella
| 
|align=center|3
|align=center|5:00
|Kansas City, Missouri, United States
|
|-
|Win
|align=center|9–4 (2)
|Iren Racz
|Decision (unanimous) 
|Mushin Fighting 3
| 
|align=center|3
|align=center|5:00
|Nuvolera, Italy
|
|-
|Win
|align=center|8–4 (2)
|Maria Casanova
|Submission (armbar)
|Kombat League: Colosseum 4
| 
|align=center|2
|align=center|2:34
|Sassari, Italy
|
|-
|NC
|align=center|7–4 (2)
|Lena Ovchynnikova
|NC (overturned by WMMAF) 
|WMMAF 2016
| 
|align=center|3
|align=center|5:00
|Lviv, Ukraine
|
|-
|Win
|align=center|7–4 (1)
|Suvi Salmimies
|Decision (Split) 
|Cage 34
| 
|align=center|3
|align=center|5:00
|Helsinki, Finland
|
|-
|Win
|align=center|6–4 (1)
|Lucrezia Ria
|Submission (armbar) 
|Kombat League: Colosseum 3
| 
|align=center|2
|align=center|3:45
|Sardinia, Italy
|
|-
|Loss
|align=center|5–4 (1)
|Jin Tang 
|TKO (punches)
|Kunlun Fight 33
| 
|align=center|1
|align=center|4:35
|Changde, China
|
|-
|Loss
|align=center|5–3 (1)
|Stephanie Egger
|TKO (corner stoppage)
|Arena Fighting Games
| 
|align=center|1
|align=center|5:00
|Milan, Italy
|
|-
|Loss
|align=center|5–2 (1)
|Anna Elmose
|KO (punches)
|UCL 23
| 
|align=center|2
|align=center|0:45
|Copenhagen, Denmark
|
|-
|Win
|align=center|5–1 (1)
|Liubov Tiupina
|Submission (armbar) 
|WMMAF 2015
| 
|align=center|1
|align=center|1:40
|Lviv, Ukraine
|
|-
|Win
|align=center|4–1 (1)
|Katia Curro
|TKO (punches)
|Shoot Fighting Championship 16
| 
|align=center|1
|align=center|4:18
|Mazzano, Italy
|
|-
|NC
|align=center|3–1 (1)
|Donatella Panu
|NC (overturned)
|FIGMMA: Colosseum MMA in the Cage
| 
|align=center|1
|align=center|4:00
|Sassari, Italy
|
|-
|Win
|align=center|3–1
|Elena Bondarenko
|TKO (punches)
|WMMAF 2014
| 
|align=center|2
|align=center|1:30
|Lviv, Ukraine
|
|-
|Win
|align=center|2–1
|Ileana Bianzeno
|Decision (unanimous)
|Kombat League: Cage Fight 14
| 
|align=center|3
|align=center|5:00
|Venezia, Italy
|
|-
|Loss
|align=center|1–1
|Debi Studer
|Submission (guillotine choke)
|Max Monster 2
| 
|align=center|2
|align=center|N/A
|Sempach, Switzerland
|
|-
|Win
|align=center|1–0
|Sara Regini
| TKO (punches)
|Shoot Fighting Championship 12
| 
|align=center|1
|align=center|1:33
|Castiglione delle Stiviere, Italy
|
|-

See also 
 List of female mixed martial artists

References

External links 
 
 
 

Living people
1986 births
Italian female mixed martial artists
Italian female judoka
Flyweight mixed martial artists
Bantamweight mixed martial artists
Mixed martial artists utilizing kickboxing
Mixed martial artists utilizing shootboxing
Mixed martial artists utilizing judo
Mixed martial artists utilizing Brazilian jiu-jitsu
Sportspeople from Piacenza
Italian practitioners of Brazilian jiu-jitsu
Female Brazilian jiu-jitsu practitioners
Italian female kickboxers
Italian people convicted of drug offenses
21st-century Italian criminals
Italian people of Honduran descent
Ultimate Fighting Championship female fighters
Kunlun Fight MMA Fighters
21st-century Italian women